The Szlakiem Grodów Piastowskich, officially known as the CCC Tour – Grody Piastowskie, is a road bicycle racing stage race held annually in Lower Silesian Voivodeship, Poland. It was first held in 1966 and since 2005, it has been organised as a 2.1 event on the UCI Europe Tour.

Winners

External links
 

Cycle races in Poland
UCI Europe Tour races
Recurring sporting events established in 1966
Sport in Lower Silesian Voivodeship
1966 establishments in Poland